Impages is a genus of sea snails, marine gastropod mollusks in the family Terebridae, the auger snails.

This genus has become a synonym of Hastula H. Adams & A. Adams, 1853

Species
Species brought into synonymy
 Impages aciculina (Lamarck, 1822): synonym of Hastula aciculina (Lamarck, 1822)
 Impages anomala (Gray, 1834): synonym of Hastula anomala (Gray, 1834)
 Impages anosyana Bozzetti, 2016: synonym of Hastula anosyana (Bozzetti, 2016) (original combination)
 Impages apicitincta (G.B. Sowerby III, 1900): synonym of Hastula apicitincta (G. B. Sowerby III, 1900)
 Impages bacillus (Deshayes, 1859): synonym of Hastula bacillus (Deshayes, 1859)
 Impages cernohorskyi (Burch, 1965): synonym of Hastula cernohorskyi R. D. Burch, 1965
 Impages cinerea (Born, 1778): synonym of Hastula cinerea (Born, 1778)
 Impages continua (Deshayes, 1859): synonym of Hastula continua (Deshayes, 1859)
 Impages daniae (Aubry, 2008): synonym of Hastula daniae (Aubry, 2008)
 Impages escondida Terryn, 2006: synonym of Hastula escondida (Terryn, 2006) (original combination)
 Impages hectica (Linnaeus, 1758): synonym of Hastula hectica (Linnaeus, 1758)
 Impages inconstans (Hinds, 1844): synonym of Hastula inconstans (Hinds, 1844)
 Impages marqueti (Aubry, 1994): synonym of Partecosta marqueti (Aubry, 1994), synonym of Hastula marqueti (Aubry, 1994)
 Impages maryleeae Burch, 1965: synonym of Hastula maryleeae R. D. Burch, 1965
 Impages nana (Deshayes, 1859): synonym of Hastula nana (Deshayes, 1859)
 Impages nassoides (Hinds, 1844): synonym of Partecosta nassoides (Hinds, 1844)
 Impages salleana (Deshayes, 1859): synonym of Hastula salleana (Deshayes, 1859)
 Impages stylata (Hinds, 1844): synonym of Hastula stylata (Hinds, 1844)

References

 Terryn Y. (2007). Terebridae: A Collectors Guide. Conchbooks & NaturalArt. 59pp + plates

External links

 Fedosov, A. E.; Malcolm, G.; Terryn, Y.; Gorson, J.; Modica, M. V.; Holford, M.; Puillandre, N. (2020). Phylogenetic classification of the family Terebridae (Neogastropoda: Conoidea). Journal of Molluscan Studies.

Terebridae